The Azerbaijan Technological University trains mechanical and technological engineers in the fields of textile, light, and food industries. It is located in Ganja, Azerbaijan and was established in 1981.

History 
Based on the presidential decree on “Improvement of the educational system” dated 13 August 2000, the Azerbaijan Technological University was founded on October 11, 2000.  The university was established by the expansion of the branches of the Azerbaijan Technological Institute by the order of the Ministry of Education of the Republic of Azerbaijan.

The Azerbaijan Technology Institute was founded by the initiation of Heydar Aliyev in 1981 who was then First Secretary of the Communist Party of Azerbaijan.

There are four faculties, a department of  postgraduate and master studies, research sector, library, resource center for the English language, computer and information center, industrial labs, and a gym at the university.

Rector 
By the presidential decree dated March 13, 2013, Akif Shamil oglu Suleymanov was appointed as the rector of the Azerbaijan Technological University.

Faculties

Faculty of Mechanics and Metallurgical engineering 
The faculty was established under the name of “Mechanics” in 1979. There are six specialties within the faculty:

Machine engineering
Process automation engineering
 Electronics, telecommunication and radio engineering
 Technological machines and devices engineering 
 Transportation and organization of management engineering
Metrology, standardization and certification engineering

Faculty of Food and Textile 

 Service in the sociocultural sphere
Tourism and hotel business
Engineering of food
 Technology and consumer goods marketing
 Technology consumer goods
 Metrology, Standardization and Certification
 Design

Faculty of Automation Telecommunication and Information Technology 
The faculty was created in 1989.

 Customs Expertise
 Communication system and communication center
Environmental Engineering
Environmental protection and efficient use of natural resources
 Expertise of consumer goods and marketing
 State and municipal management
 Technology of Consumer  
 Legal economy settlement

References

External links
Official website 

 
Universities in Ganja
Buildings and structures in Ganja, Azerbaijan
Technical universities and colleges in Azerbaijan
Science and technology in Azerbaijan
Universities and institutes established in the Soviet Union
Educational institutions established in 1981
1981 establishments in the Soviet Union